Marvin Möller (born 18 January 1999) is a German tennis player.

On the junior tour, Möller has a career high ITF junior ranking of 22 achieved in June 2016. Möller reached the quarterfinals of the 2016 French Open boys' singles event as a qualifier.

Möller made his ATP main draw debut at the 2016 German Open.

ATP Challengers and ITF Futures/World Tennis Tour finals

Singles: 9 (4–5)

Doubles: 4 (1–3)

References

External links
 
 

1999 births
Living people
German male tennis players
Tennis players from Hamburg